Thorn is a surname that may refer to:

People
 Abigail Thorn (b. 1993), British actress, YouTuber, and philosopher
 Andy Thorn (disambiguation), several people
 Brad Thorn, Australian/New Zealand rugby footballer
 Erin Thorn (born 1981), American basketball player
 Frank Thorn (disambiguation)
 Frank Manly Thorn (1836–1907), lawyer, politician, government official, essayist, journalist, humorist, and inventor, sixth Superintendent of the United States Coast and Geodetic Survey
 Frankie Thorn (b. 1964), American actress
 Gaston Thorn (1928–2007), Luxembourg politician
 George Thorn (1838–1905), premier of Queensland, Australia
 Gerrit T. Thorn (1835-1900), American politician
 Jesse Thorn (born 1981), American public radio host and show creator
 John Thorn (born 1947), sports historian, author, and publisher
 Jonathan Thorn (1779–1811), U.S. Navy officer
 Matt Thorn (born 1965), cultural anthropologist and professor
 Paul Thorn, American singer-songwriter
 Philip Thorn (born 1951), English cricketer
 Robyn Thorn (born 1945), Australian swimmer and Olympic medalist
 Rod Thorn (born 1941), American basketball executive and former player
 Tracey Thorn (born 1962), English singer-songwriter
 Victor Thorn (1844–1930), prime minister of Luxembourg
 Vikki Thorn, Australian musician, member of the band The Waifs
 Viktor Thorn (Nordic combined skier), Norwegian athlete in Nordic combined event
 Viktor Thorn (cross-country skier)

Fictional characters
 Becca Thorn, character in television series Dominion
Charlie "Chip" Thorn, one of the protagonists in Power Rangers Mystic Force
 Damien Thorn, primary antagonist of The Omen series.

See also

Thorne (surname)
House Thorn, fictional noble house in television series Dominion
Thom
Thoen (name)
Thon (name)

German-language surnames
Surnames of Luxembourgian origin
Surnames of Polish origin
English-language surnames